Thaler is a silver coin used throughout Europe for almost four hundred years.

Thaler may also refer to:
 Thaler (surname)
 Kaplan Thaler Group, an integrated marketing and advertising agency based in New York City